Beagle is an unincorporated community in Jackson County, Oregon, United States. It lies along Beagle Road, off Oregon Route 234, northeast of Gold Hill and southwest of Shady Cove in the Rogue River Valley.

The community is named after William Beagle, an early settler. Beagle had a post office from 1885 through 1941. William Beagle was one of its early postmasters.

References

Unincorporated communities in Jackson County, Oregon
Unincorporated communities in Oregon